Felicitas Hoppe (born 22 December 1960) is a German writer. She received the Georg Büchner Prize in 2012.

Biography

Early years
Felicitas Hoppe was born in Hamelin, Lower Saxony, and grew up there. After her Abitur she studied literature, rhetorics and theology: from 1982 to 1984 at the Eberhard Karls Universität in Tübingen, from 1984 to 1986 at the University of Oregon and from 1987 to 1990 at the Freien Universität Berlin. In 2006 she was a visiting scholar at Dartmouth College. She worked as a dramaturge and journalist. Since 1996 she has been a freelance writer living in Berlin.

Career
Her work often deals with transitory themes, as in "Picknick der Friseure", in a comical, but nevertheless thrilling way, which make her stories seem to be absurd. She also uses the technique of quotation for her novels, as in "Johanna", where she reconstructs the story of Joan of Arc using official case records. As a relatively young, successful and female writer, she belongs to a group of writers which literary criticism calls the "Fräuleinwunder". She also writes children's books.

In 2005 she also held the Poetikdozentur: junge Autoren der Fachhochschule Wiesbaden. In 2007 she received Literaturpreis der Stadt Bremen and the Roswitha-Preis. In 2008 Hoppe held the Bert Brecht Gastprofessur at the University of Augsburg.

In 2012, Hoppe was awarded the most prestigious literary prize in German literature, the Georg Büchner Prize. In 2020, she was awarded the first Großer Preis des Deutschen Literaturfonds.

Works
 Unglückselige Begebenheiten, Eppelheim 1991 
 Picknick der Friseure, Rowohlt Verlag, Reinbek bei Hamburg 1996 
 Das Richtfest, Berlin 1997
 Drei Kapitäne, Berlin 1998
 Pigafetta, Reinbek bei Hamburg 1999 
 Vom Bäcker und seiner Frau, Berlin 1999
 Die Torte, Berlin 2000
 Fakire und Flötisten, Berlin 2001
 Paradiese, Übersee, Reinbek bei Hamburg 2003, Fischer Verlag, Frankfurt am Main 2006 
 Die Reise nach Java, Berlin 2003
 Verbrecher und Versager, Hamburg 2004 
 Ausgerutscht, Mathegeschichte
 Johanna, Fischer Verlag, Frankfurt am Main 2006 
 Iwein Löwenritter, Frankfurt am Main 2008 
 Sieben Schätze. Augsburger Vorlesungen, Frankfurt am Main 2009 
 Der beste Platz der Welt, Dörlemann Verlag, Zürich 2009 
 Abenteuer – was ist das?, Wallstein Verlag, Göttingen 2010, 
 Hoppe, Fischer Verlag, Frankfurt am Main 2012, 
 Kröne dich selbst – sonst krönt dich keiner., Universitätsverlag Winter, Heidelberg 2018, 
 Prawda. Eine amerikanische Reise. Fischer Verlag, Frankfurt am Main 2018, 
 The Making of Prawda., Distanz Verlag, Berlin 2019, 
 Grimms Märchen für Heldinnen von heute und morgen., Editor: Felicitas Hoppe, Reclam, Ditzingen 2019,

References

External links

 
 
 Michaela Holdenried: Anmerkungen zur postmodernen Zitationspraxis und Autorschaft im Werk von Felicitas Hoppe (pdf-Datei, 184 KB)
 Felicitas Hoppe im Interview über Handlungsorte in ihrem Werk

1960 births
Living people
People from Hamelin
20th-century German women writers
Georg Büchner Prize winners
21st-century German women writers
20th-century German novelists
21st-century German novelists
German women novelists